Rock Creek is a  river in Missoula and Granite County, Montana.  Rock Creek is a tributary of the Clark Fork river. The river's headwaters are in Lolo National Forest near Phillipsburg, Montana.  The river roughly parallels the Sapphire Mountains and enters the Clark Fork of the Columbia River near Clinton, Montana. Sapphires are found along the river.

Rock Creek is also a stream in south central Montana in Carbon County.  It flows from Glacier Lake, travels south into Wyoming before turning north back into Montana.  It flows through the town of Red Lodge before entering the Clarks Fork of the Yellowstone River, which is not to be confused with the Clark Fork of the Columbia River which is what the other Rock Creek flows into.

The 2022 Montana floods at Rock Creek caused catastrophic damage to parts of Red Lodge.

Angling
Rock Creek is a popular fly fishing river for locals and destination anglers.  It contains rainbow, brown, westslope cutthroat and the threatened bull trout.

Notes

Rivers of Montana
Tributaries of the Columbia River
Bodies of water of Granite County, Montana
Bodies of water of Missoula County, Montana